Around the World in 80 Days with Michael Palin is a 7-part BBC television travel series first broadcast on BBC1 in 1989. It was presented by comedian and actor Michael Palin. The show was inspired by Jules Verne's classic 1873 novel Around the World in Eighty Days, in which a character named Phileas Fogg accepts a wager to circumnavigate the globe in eighty days or less.

Palin was given the same deadline, and not allowed to use aircraft, which did not exist in Jules Verne's time and would make completing the journey far too easy. He followed Phileas Fogg's route as closely as possible. Along the way he commented on the sights and cultures he encountered. Palin encountered several setbacks during his voyage, partly because he travelled with a five-person film crew, who are collectively named after Passepartout, Phileas Fogg's manservant.

The programme was a critical and commercial success, gaining strong ratings in the UK and selling well abroad. It was also released on video tape and later on DVD. Following the trip Michael Palin wrote a book about the experience. The book contains much more detail, along with photographs, than could be presented in the TV programme, and Palin's personal views are also more evident.

Around the World in 80 Days was the first of a trilogy of globe-crossing series featuring Michael Palin as he visited many countries. The second series was Pole to Pole with Michael Palin (travelling from the North Pole to the South Pole), an 8-part series first broadcast on BBC One in 1992, and the third was Full Circle with Michael Palin (the circumnavigation of the Pacific Rim), a 10-part series first broadcast on BBC One in 1997. The series were followed by several similar conceptual travel series featuring Palin as he concentrated on smaller areas of the world. Hemingway Adventure (following in the footsteps of Ernest Hemingway) first broadcast in 1999, Sahara (travelling around and through the Sahara Desert) first broadcast in 2002, Himalaya (travelling around the Himalayas) first broadcast in 2004, New Europe (travelling around Eastern Europe) first broadcast in 2007, Brazil first broadcast in 2012, and Michael Palin in North Korea broadcast in 2018.

The Journey

The series was presented in seven episodes.

The Challenge
Palin accepts the offer from the BBC to attempt travelling around the world in 80 days. After setting off from the Reform Club in London, he boards the Orient Express at Victoria Station in London, while reminiscing on his rigorous preparations for his upcoming circumnavigation, which included a daily exercise programme, a chat with seasoned TV traveller Alan Whicker, who was the BBC's (but not the production team's, who deliberately talked him out of it) first choice for the series and would go on to criticise the show, calling it "a seven-hour ego trip", and the purchase of an inflatable globe. He also has dinner with his 'referees', who include Robert Hewison and fellow Pythons Terry Jones and Terry Gilliam. After taking a ferry across the English Channel, Palin crosses the Alps on board the Venice-Simplon Orient Express before being stopped in Innsbruck due to an Italian railway strike. Arriving in Venice by coach, he helps the local sanitation department clean up the city. After that, he travels through the Corinth Canal to Athens, where he sees the world-renowned Evzones, and meets a die-hard Python fan. After a brief stopover in Crete, Alexandria beckons.

Sections:
 Outward Bound
 Preparations
 The Ultimate Traveller
 Orient Express
 Bad News
 Venice
 Travelling by Ferry
 An Evening Meal

Arabian Frights
Palin arrives in Alexandria, Egypt, and has difficulty getting a train to Cairo. On arrival, he attends a local football match and appears in a cameo role in an Egyptian film. After seeing the Pyramids in Giza and riding a camel named Michael, Palin runs into difficulties when the ship he was supposed to board has engine problems and cannot sail. Even though he is able to take a ferry from the city of Suez to Jeddah, Saudi Arabia, he misses a key connection that would have taken him to Muscat. As a last-ditch effort to save the journey, Palin and the director Clem Vallance (and somebody from the British Embassy and a driver for some of the way) are permitted by the Saudi authorities to drive across Saudi Arabia to Dubai, with the rest of the crew (and their problematic camera equipment) making the journey by air.  The Saudi Arabia leg of the trip is represented in the TV series only with a few still pictures taken along the way.

Sections:
 Arabian Frights
 The Road to Cairo
 A Closer Look
 An Appointment to Keep
 Problems
 At Sea
 Jeddah
 A Plan

Ancient Mariners
Palin recounts his trip from Jeddah to Dubai via Riyadh, and notes that he drove the distance from London to the Black Sea in one weekend.

In Dubai, the team finds a dhow named the Al-Shama to take them to Bombay. Along the way, Palin bonds with the dhow's crew who were an extended family from the Indian state of Gujarat, letting the oldest one listen to a Bruce Springsteen song on his Walkman, and developing a bad case of diarrhoea, resulting in many trips to the ship's unique open-air latrine. The journey took seven days on what became the most famous part of the whole trip featured in the series.

The trip on the dhow yielded so much material that the producers gained special permission to craft this extra seventh episode for what was originally planned as a six-episode series.  In the interview included with the DVD release, Palin said that he would like to meet the dhow's crew and thank them again for their gracious hospitality, though he remarks that he may never see them again. In September 2008, Palin announced on his official website that he would be travelling to Gujarat in an attempt to locate the crew and reunite with them.  Palin succeeded in finding them and this journey was chronicled in the BBC television documentary, Around the World in 20 Years.

Sections:
 Ancient Mariners
 Provisions
 Mohammed
 Life at Sea
 Chips
 Raising the Mast
 Bombay Bum
 A First Glimpse of India

A Close Shave
In Bombay, Palin finds himself a week behind Phileas Fogg. After getting a quick shave from a blind barber under a tree and seeing a snake charmer's cobra, he is able to get a train ticket to Madras in south-eastern India. Before leaving Bombay, he visits astrologer Jagjit Uppal who, after giving him a chart for a baby to be born to one of his referees, Robert Hewison, tells him he will complete the journey on time, possibly even ahead of schedule and that time lost will be made up throughout the voyage. He also suggests that this will be just the first of many epic journeys Palin will make over the coming years.

Palin then embarks on the Indian Railways express line called the "Southern Express" for Madras in Tamil Nadu state. On the way, it stops in Pune, where Palin talks about his father winning two rowing cups there in 1923. In Madras, he has difficulty finding a connecting boat to Singapore. Eventually, an "...Anglo-German-Indo-Yugoslav agreement the UN would have been proud of" was reached and Palin sets off on a Yugoslavian freighter, eleven days behind. The agreement allowed only Palin and the cameraman Nigel Meakin to travel aboard the ship, and on condition that they worked as deckhands. That meant that Palin had to take a "crash course in sound recording" so they could film aboard the ship. Arriving in Singapore, Palin worries whether or not his connecting boat from Singapore has sailed. If it had, it would have been impossible to complete the journey in eighty days.

Palin later reunited with the captain of the Croatian ship in Rijeka, Croatia, during filming of his New Europe series. This meeting was not shown in the original broadcast of the series but it is on the deleted scenes on the DVD.

Sections:
 A Close Shave
 A Day in Bombay
 Off to Madras
 Making Friends
 Arrival
 A Boat to Singapore 
 11 Days Behind Schedule
 Waiting to Dock

Oriental Express
Palin finds that the ship had indeed sailed from Singapore. However, quite fortunately, it was only four miles from shore and Palin was able to make it on board using a fast motorboat. While in Hong Kong, he has a big win betting on a horse race, is attacked by a cockatoo and meets up with his friend, photographer Basil Pao. He attends a party thrown in his honour at the halfway point (in terms of days) in the journey. Then it is on to Guangzhou for a dinner of shredded cobra and then a train journey to Shanghai. On the train, he is asked by a Chinese businesswoman if he carries an umbrella all the time. Palin replied, "I just get wet." He also collects the roofing tile requested by Terry Gilliam from a very old railway station.

Sections:
 Oriental Express
 Welcome to Hong Kong
 Local Life
 The Hong Kong Riviera
 "China, here we come" 
 A Snake Supper
 The Train to Shanghai
 A Four Seasons Climate

Far East and Farther East
In Shanghai, Palin gets some herbal remedies to help him on the rest of his trip. He and Basil Pao take in a Chinese jazz band. After parting with Pao the next day, Palin takes a Chinese ferry to Yokohama, where he rides the world-famous shinkansen train to Tokyo. Here he meets David Powers, a British journalist, and is taken to a sushi bar and then a karaoke bar, where he sings a duet of "You Are My Sunshine". After spending the night in a capsule hotel, he boards a container ship to cross the Pacific Ocean. The journey takes eleven days and is very dull, enlivened only by a game of pass the parcel with the Singaporean crew, and the crossing of the International Date Line.  Palin partakes in an unusual ceremony to commemorate crossing the line, involving getting doused in tomato paste and flour, and drinking a strange cocktail containing many ingredients, among others, "eggs, curry powder, cocoa...". Palin suggests that some people involved in the ceremony had watched Full Metal Jacket to prepare for it.

Sections:
 Far East and Farther East
 Time to Move On
 Japan
 Karaoke
 The Neptune Garnet
 Worsening Weather
 Ship-Lag
 Halfway Round the World

Dateline to Deadline
Arriving in Long Beach, California only two days behind Fogg, Palin spends his first night in America aboard the permanently berthed Queen Mary. After a few days, he boards Amtrak's Desert Wind in Los Angeles and travels to Glenwood Springs, Colorado in the Rocky Mountains. He takes a hot-air balloon ride and a dog sled trip in Aspen, Colorado. After a nerve-wracking delay he realises he probably should have stayed on the Chicago-bound train. Eventually arriving in New York City (Palin was actually supposed to depart North America from Nova Scotia, Canada, as he mentions earlier in the film, but the reason for the substitution for New York is not mentioned in either the film or the book, although the delay due to the stopover in Colorado is a probable cause). However, in the first episode it is mentioned that departure from either New York City or Nova Scotia would be where the final leg of the journey would take place. He boards the final ship of his journey dead even with Phileas Fogg on day 71. This container ship takes eight days to cross the Atlantic Ocean, and after a quick lunch in Le Havre, Palin arrives in Felixstowe, touching Great Britain for the first time in two and a half months. A few train connections later he arrives at his starting point, the Reform Club in London, but is not allowed in to film, but Palin does get a warm welcome at the BBC with his referees. The journey ends 79 days and 7 hours after it began. The closing credits show Palin chatting with his referees at the BBC offices as he presents the souvenirs requested by them at the beginning to ceremonially prove his accomplishment.

Sections:
 Dateline to Deadline
 America by Train
 Glenwood Springs
 Behind Schedule Again
 New York Bound
 Nine Days Left
 Felixstowe
 The End in Sight

Production
The journey around the world lasted from 25 September to 12 December 1988. Palin travelled through the following countries by foot, train, ship, balloon, and husky dog, amongst other methods of transport (except for aircraft): United Kingdom, France, Switzerland, Liechtenstein, Austria, Italy, Greece, Egypt, Saudi Arabia, Qatar, United Arab Emirates, India, Singapore, Hong Kong, China, Japan, and the United States.

Only four members of Palin's film crew completed the circumnavigation: Clem Vallance, Roger Mills (the directors), Angela Elbourne, and Ann Holland (the production assistants). The three others who started with him left when they got to Hong Kong, and were replaced by others. Strictly speaking, it was only Palin who obeyed the rules of the journey, as the production team was not allowed on the road trip across Saudi Arabia and Qatar (Palin and Clem Vallance did this stretch) or on the Croatian ship (Palin and Nigel Meakin did this stretch). The remainder of the team flew on these stretches. During the Jeddah to Dubai episode, Palin managed to snap a few pictures which are seen in the documentary.

While preparing for the journey, Palin had a chat with renowned documentarist Alan Whicker. In the book and an interview on the DVD, Palin mentions that Whicker had been the BBC's first choice of presenter, but he and two others (Miles Kington and Noel Edmonds) had declined; Palin was fourth on the BBC's list.

Around the World in 20 Years
On 30 December 2008, the BBC aired a special one-hour documentary entitled Around the World in 20 Years. In it, Palin goes in search of the crew of the Al Shama, the dhow which carried him from Dubai to Bombay (now Mumbai) some 20 years ago. After an extensive search involving the shipping company that owned Al Shama, Palin tracks them to the city of Mandvi in Gujarat. There, Palin finds the captain of Al Shama himself, along with five other members of the crew. Two of the original crew members had died in the intervening years, one of them being the older man whom Palin had let listen to Bruce Springsteen on his Walkman. Palin also discovers that the Al Shama had sunk in the Indian Ocean while being towed for repairs years before. The production crew are the same people as on 80 Days.

See also

References

External links
Palin's Travels – the official web site

1989 British television series debuts
1989 British television series endings
1980s British documentary television series
1980s British travel television series
Television shows based on Around the World in Eighty Days
BBC television documentaries
BBC travel television series
English-language television shows
Works by Michael Palin
Television shows set in India
Television shows set in Mumbai
Television shows set in Pune
Chennai